Paul Samuel Fox (September 30, 1898 – May 1972) was an American set decorator. He won three Academy Awards and was nominated for ten more in the category Best Art Direction.

Selected filmography
Fox won three Academy Awards for Best Art Direction and was nominated for ten more:
Won
 The Robe (1953)
 The King and I (1956)
 Cleopatra (1963)

Nominated
 The Razor's Edge (1946)
 The Foxes of Harrow (1947)
 Come to the Stable (1949)
 David and Bathsheba (1951)
 The House on Telegraph Hill (1951)
 The Snows of Kilimanjaro (1952)
 The President's Lady (1953)
 Desirée (1954)
 Daddy Long Legs (1955)
 A Certain Smile (1958)

References

External links

1898 births
1972 deaths
20th Century Studios people
American set decorators
Best Art Direction Academy Award winners